Brendan "Benny" Tierney (Irish: Breandan Ó Tiarnaigh) is a former Gaelic football goalkeeper who played at senior level for the Armagh county team between 1989 and 2002, and also for the Mullaghbawn club. Tierney is a headmaster of St Peter's primary school in Cloughreagh (close to Newry). He is also a sports opinion journalist for The Irish News.

In the later part of his career, Tierney was known for his colorful goalkeeper shirts.

Honours

 Ulster Senior Football Championship (3) -  1999, 2000, 2002
 All-Ireland Senior Football Championship (1) - 2002
 Ulster Senior Club Championship (1) - 1995
 Armagh Senior Football Championship (1) - 1995
 Armagh Intermediate Football Championship (1) - 1992

References

Living people
Year of birth missing (living people)
Armagh inter-county Gaelic footballers
Heads of schools in Northern Ireland
Irish sports journalists
Mullaghbawn Gaelic footballers